Webster Schroeder High School is a public high school located in Webster, Monroe County, New York, U.S.A., a suburb of Rochester, and is one of two high schools operated by the Webster Central School District.

History
In Fall 1972, the school was split from the existing high school in the Webster Central School District. Originally named Herbert W. Schroeder High School, after Webster Schools Superintendent, 1959–1969. The first graduating class was in 1973. At that time the school mascot was the Schroeder Lion.  In Fall 1984, the two high schools were reorganized as a junior and senior high school. In Fall 2002, they were again reorganized into two high schools, the other being Webster Thomas High School.

Extracurricular activities 

Webster Schroeder participates in many extracurricular activities. These activities include: Chess Club, College & Career Center Club, Drama Program, Explorer Post, Future Business Leaders of America, Future Educators of America, International Language Club, Key Club, Library Club, Link Crew, Marching Band, MasterMinds, Monroe County Math League, Model UN, National Honor Society, Photography Club, Rotary Interact, Science Olympiad, Ski Club, SparX Robotics, Speech and Debate, Student Council, Tri-M, and Yearbook Club.

The school's Science Olympiad team has existed since 2002 when it split from a joint team between Schroeder and Webster Thomas High School. Since then the team has participated in the state tournament multiple times, the highest award achieved was 6th place overall in New York state in 2004, 2014 and 2015.

Notable alumni
 Susan Gibney, Class of 1979, television and motion picture actor
 Johnny Palermo, Class of 2000, television actor
 Gregor Gillespie, Class of 2005, 2x State Champion wrestler; professional Mixed Martial Artist in the UFC
 Chris Perfetti, Class of 2007, actor, notably in Crossbones, Looking, and Abbott Elementary
 Kate Lee Gurnow, Class of 2010, fiddler and singer, member of Grammy Award-winning group O'Connor Family Band
 Brian Bliss, Former footballer for the US National Team
 Grant Catalino, Professional lacrosse player for the Long Island Lizards

Footnotes

High schools in Monroe County, New York
Public high schools in New York (state)